Burghalden is a railway station in the Swiss canton of Zurich and municipality of Richterswil. It is located on the Südostbahn's Wädenswil to Einsiedeln line, and is served by Zurich S-Bahn line S13.

References

External links 

Burghalden station on Swiss Federal Railway's web site

Burghalden
Richterswil
Südostbahn stations